"" ("Liberty"), also known as "" ("Four Comorian Islands"), was the national anthem of Comoros from 1975 or 1976 to 1978, when a coup by Ahmed Abdallah and Bob Denard took place, and it was replaced by the current anthem, "Udzima wa ya Masiwa". It was written and composed by Abdérémane Chihabiddine, better known as Abou Chihabi, a musician with the Comorian folk band Folkomor Océan. It was adopted under the Ali Soilih administration following a competition won by Chihabi.

Mayotte (claimed by the Comoros but under French administration) is also mentioned in the song.

Lyrics

Notes

References

External links 
 YouTube video of the anthem (archive link)
 YouTube video of Abou Chihabi speaking about the anthem (in French) (archive link)

National anthems
Comorian music
National symbols of the Comoros
1976 songs
African anthems